The following is a list of the monastic houses in County Durham, England.

Alphabetical listing

See also
 List of monastic houses in England

Notes

References

Citations

Bibliography

History of County Durham
England in the High Middle Ages
Medieval sites in England
Lists of buildings and structures in County Durham
.
.
.
Durham
Durham
Church of England church buildings in County Durham